Matthew Peter Nielsen (born 3 February 1978) is an Australian professional basketball coach and former player who currently serves as an assistant coach for the San Antonio Spurs of the National Basketball Association (NBA). He served as an assistant coach for the Perth Wildcats of the National Basketball League (NBL) from 2015 to 2019.

Early life and career
Nielsen was born in the Sydney suburb of Penrith. He played as a junior for Newcastle Basketball Association and attended St Marys Senior High School.

In 1995, Nielsen played for the Sydney Sky in the SEABL and made his NBL debut with the Sydney Kings as a development player. In 1996, he moved to Canberra to attend the Australian Institute of Sport (AIS). He played for the AIS in the SEABL. He was named SEABL East Youth Player of the Year in 1995 and 1996. He played six games for the Sky in 1997 and played for the Penrith Panthers in the SEABL in 2000.

Professional career

Sydney Kings
For the 1997 NBL season, Nielsen returned to the Sydney Kings and won the NBL Rookie of the Year Award. He played in the NBL Future Forces Game and finished third in the NBL Best Sixth Man Award in 1997. He was named in the All-NBL Second Team in 2001 and 2003 and won his first NBL championship in 2003. In the 2003–04 NBL season, Nielsen was named league MVP, All-NBL First Team, grand final MVP and captained the Kings to back-to-back championships. He also led the league in scoring with an average of 23.5 points per game, was second in rebounds (10.1) and second in blocked shots (2.7).

In 244 games for the Kings over nine seasons, Nielsen averaged 17.5 points, 8.0 rebounds, 2.6 assists, 1.0 steals and 1.5 blocks per game. In 2013, he was named in the Sydney Kings 25th Anniversary Team.

Europe

In 2004, Nielsen began a decorated European career playing for PAOK Thessaloniki in Greece, Lietuvos Rytas in Lithuania, Valencia in Spain, Olympiacos Piraeus also in Greece, and Khimki in Russia.

National team career
Nielsen won the gold medal at the 1997 FIBA Under-21 World Championship with Australia's junior national team. He was also a member of the senior men's Australian national basketball team. With Australia's senior national team, he won gold medals at the 2001 Goodwill Games, the 2003 FIBA Oceanian Championship, and the 2005 FIBA Oceania Championship. He represented Australia at the 2004, 2008 and 2012 Olympics.

Coaching career

Clubs
During the 2013–14 NBL season, Nielsen served as a big-man coach for the Perth Wildcats.

In 2014, Nielsen joined the San Antonio Spurs coaching staff in a player development role, on a contract that ran through to the end of the 2015 NBA Summer League.

On 29 July 2015, Nielsen returned to the Perth Wildcats, signing with the club as an assistant coach ahead of the 2015–16 NBL season. On 10 April 2019, after three championships in four seasons, Nielsen parted ways with the Wildcats in order to pursue coaching opportunities in the United States.

On 5 November 2019, Nielsen was appointed assistant coach of the Austin Spurs of the NBA G League. On 10 November 2020, he was promoted to head coach of the Spurs.

On 8 September 2021, Nielsen was appointed assistant coach of the San Antonio Spurs.

National team
On 8 December 2020, Nielsen was named as assistant coach of the Australian senior men's national team under head coach Brian Goorjian.

EuroLeague career statistics

|-
| style="text-align:left;"| 2005–06
| style="text-align:left;"| Lietuvos Rytas
| 19 || 13 || 25.8 || .464 || .357 || .703 || 5.2 || 1.7 || 1.1 || .3 || 12.4 || 13.6
|-
| style="text-align:left;"| 2007–08
| style="text-align:left;"| Lietuvos Rytas
| 13 || 13 || 24.1 || .495 || .250 || .805 || 4.8 || 1.5 || .8 || .5 || 9.9 || 12.2
|-
| style="text-align:left;"| 2010–11
| style="text-align:left;"| Olympiacos Piraeus
| 14 || 9 || 16.0 || .386 || .143 || .750 || 2.9 || .6 || .6 || .1 || 4.4 || 3.9
|-
| style="text-align:left;"| 2012–13
| style="text-align:left;"| Khimki
| 15 || 2 || 11.5 || .462 || .000 || .500 || 1.7 || 1.6 || .3 || .3 || 1.7 || 3.1
|- class="sortbottom"
| style="text-align:center;" colspan="2"| Career
| 61 || 37 || 19.6 || .459 || .261 || .729 || 3.7 || 1.4 || .7 || .3 || 7.4 || 8.5

References

External links

 NBL profile
 Euroleague.net profile
 ACB.com profile 
 2010 FIBA World Championship profile

1978 births
Living people
Australian expatriate basketball people in Greece
Australian expatriate basketball people in Spain
Australian men's basketball players
Australian Institute of Sport basketball players
Basketball players at the 2004 Summer Olympics
Basketball players at the 2008 Summer Olympics
Basketball players at the 2012 Summer Olympics
BC Khimki players
BC Rytas players
Liga ACB players
Olympiacos B.C. players
Olympic basketball players of Australia
P.A.O.K. BC players
Power forwards (basketball)
Sydney Kings players
Valencia Basket players
2010 FIBA World Championship players
Competitors at the 2001 Goodwill Games